The Zulu calendar is the traditional lunar calendar used by the Zulu people of South Africa. Its new year begins at the new moon of uMandulo(September) in the Gregorian calendar.

The Zulu calendar is divided into two seasons, the summer iHlobo and Winter ubuSika. The lunar seasonal calendar has 13 months that do not correspond to the months of the Gregorian calendar.

Twelve of the lunar months (inyanga) of the Zulu calendar have around 28 days. Zulu names for the lunar months are based on observations of nature and seasonal activities. A 13th intercalary month lasts four to five days.

According to Keith Snedegar, consensus was used to settle arguments over the correct month, which arose around every three years when the 12 lunar months failed to correspond to their natural markers. The extra month was sometimes referred to as Ndid'amDoda (the month that puzzles men). Scottish Free Kirk missionary James Macdonald wrote that the confusion was settled with heliacal rising of Pleiades, which is associated with the month of uNhlangulana.

Months (Izinyanga Zonyaka)extra notes  in zulu language

Festivals
 Umkhosi Wokweshwama
 Umkhosi woMhlanga
 uMathayi Marula Festival - In Umkhanyakude District, the Thembe clan harvests the marula fruit. Older women from the clan deliver their crops to their chief.

See also
 Xhosa calendar
 Sesotho calendar
 Shona calendar
 Akan calendar
 Igbo calendar
 Yoruba calendar

References

Calendar
Calendar
Specific calendars